Jenő Szinyei Merse (7 December 1888 – 8 September 1957) was a Hungarian politician, who served as Minister of Religion and Education between 1942 and 1944. He was one of the deputy speakers of the House of Representatives of Hungary from 1938.

References
 Magyar Életrajzi Lexikon

1888 births
1957 deaths
Politicians from Budapest
Education ministers of Hungary